Simon Hawke (born September 30, 1951) is an  American author of mainly science fiction and fantasy novels. He was born Nicholas Valentin Yermakov, but began writing as Simon Hawke in 1984 and later changed his legal name to Hawke. He has also written near future adventure novels under the pen name J. D. Masters and a series of humorous mystery novels. He was the Colorado Writer of the Year, 1992.

Career
As Nicholas Yermakov (he is half-Russian), his early books were published in 1981-1984, including two Battlestar Galactica novelizations. Since re-launching his career as Simon Hawke in 1984, he has produced a large volume of lighter fiction. Almost all of his books published after 1984 have been either part of a series and/or tie-in novels and novelizations.

His first major work as Simon Hawke was the Timewars series, which recounts the adventures of an organization tasked with protecting history from being changed by time travellers. In the world of the series, many people and events we consider fictional are historical, and vice versa; the action of each book in the series weaves in and out of the events of a famous work of literature. For example, in the first book in the series time travellers contesting the fate of Richard I of England become caught up in Walter Scott's Ivanhoe.

He has also written a series of humorous murder mysteries which features a young William Shakespeare and a fictional friend, Symington "Tuck" Smythe.

In 2017, he received the Phoenix Award from DeepSouthCon 55.

Bibliography
Boomerang (as Nicholas Yermakov) 
Last Communion (1981)
Epiphany (1982)
Jehad (1984)

 TimeWars 
The Ivanhoe Gambit (1984)
The Timekeeper Conspiracy (1984)
The Pimpernel Plot (1984)
The Zenda Vendetta (1985)
The Nautilus Sanction (1985)
The Khyber Connection (1986)
The Argonaut Affair (1987)
The Dracula Caper (1988)
The Lilliput Legion (1989)
The Hellfire Rebellion (1990)
The Cleopatra Crisis (1990)
The Six-Gun Solution (1991)

Psychodrome 
Psychodrome (1987)
Psychodrome 2: The Shapechanger Scenario (1988)

Wizard of 4th Street 
The Wizard of 4th Street (1987)
The Wizard of Whitechapel (1988)
The Wizard of Sunset Strip (1989)
The Wizard of Rue Morgue (1990)
The Samurai Wizard (1991)
The Wizard of Santa Fe (1991)
The Wizard of Camelot (1993)
The Wizard of Lovecraft's Cafe (1993)
The 9 Lives of Catseye Gomez (1991 [spinoff, a 28-page short story published by Roadkill Press]
The Nine Lives of Catseye Gomez (1992) [spinoff novel, expansion of the previous title]
The Last Wizard (1997)

Donovan Steele (as J. D. Masters)
Steele (June 1989) 
Cold Steele (October 1989)  
Killer Steele (January 1990)  
Jagged Steele (May 1990)  
Renegade Steele (September 1990) 
Target Steele (November 1990)

The Reluctant Sorcerer 
The Reluctant Sorcerer (1992)
The Inadequate Adept (1993)
The Ambivalent Magician (1997)

Battlestar Galactica (novelizations, as Nicholas Yermakov) 
Battlestar Galactica #6: The Living Legend (1982) (with Glen Larson)
Battlestar Galactica #7: War of the Gods (1982) (with Glen Larson)

Star Trek
Star Trek #69: The Patrian Transgression (1994)
Star Trek, the Next Generation #26: The Romulan Prize (1993)
Star Trek, the Next Generation #34: Blaze of Glory (1995)

Novelizations 
Predator 2 (1990)
To Stalk a Specter (1991)
Friday the 13th, Part I (1987)
Friday the 13th, Part II (1988)
Friday the 13th, Part III (1988)
Jason Lives: Friday the 13th, Part VI (1986)

Dungeons & Dragons 
The Outcast (1993)
The Seeker (1994)
The Nomad (1994)
The Broken Blade (1995)
The Iron Throne (1995)
War (1996)

Shakespeare & Smythe mysteries
A Mystery of Errors (2000)
The Slaying of the Shrew (2001)
Much Ado About Murder (2002)
The Merchant of Vengeance (2003)

Standalone novels
Journey from Flesh (1981) (as Nicholas Yermakov)
Clique (1982) (as Nicholas Yermakov)
Fall Into Darkness (1982) (as Nicholas Yermakov)
Sons of Glory: Call to Battle (1993)
The Whims of Creation (1995)

References

External links
 

1951 births
20th-century American male writers
20th-century American novelists
21st-century American male writers
21st-century American novelists
American fantasy writers
American male novelists
American mystery writers
American science fiction writers
Living people